Huguenot High School, part of the Richmond Public Schools system, is a high school located in Richmond, Virginia, United States, with grades 9–12. 
Huguenot High School was named in honor of the Huguenots, French Protestants who emigrated to the English Virginia Colony beginning in the early 18th century.

History

Land for the benefit of children
Huguenot High School and nearby Fred D. Thompson Middle School were built on land which was earlier known as "The Old Burton Place", a  tract with an antebellum farmhouse. The land, described by a historian as poor for farming due to the many rocks on the site, was purchased by J.R.F. and Lucy Burroughs, a childless couple. In 1889, they opened an orphanage originally called "The Home for Friendless Children". The devout couple never solicited for funds, but there are tales of the support they received anyway. When Mr. Burroughs died in 1915, he was buried at a site now surrounded by neighboring apartments. There, his tombstone reads "Faithful unto Death". Burroughs Street  in nearby Bon Air was named for the couple.

After Mr. Burroughs died, the orphanage was taken over by others, and became known as the Bethany Home. It was supported by the community, notably including Bon Air Presbyterian Church, until it closed during the 1940s. Part of the facility was used for the elderly and disabled, and some of the land north of modern Forest Hill Avenue still in such use at the beginning of the 21st century.

1960–1970: Chesterfield County
Huguenot High School was built by Chesterfield County Public Schools in the Bon Air area and opened on September 6, 1960. About the same time, Meadowbrook High School, also located close to the border with Richmond, was built to a similar plan.

The first principal of the new Huguenot High, serving until 1968, was Gurney Holland Reid, a longtime principal of Manchester High School for whom G. H. Reid Elementary School was named by Chesterfield County. A fourteen classroom addition was completed around 1964. G. H. Reid retired at the end of the 1968-69 school year, the last before the city annexed the land occupied by the school the following January 1.

1970 Richmond–Chesterfield annexation
The annexation became effective January 1, 1970.

As part of Richmond Public Schools
The city school system started operating Huguenot High School in the summer of 1970. At almost the same time as the annexed area was added to the city, Richmond Public Schools began a court-ordered desegregation busing program in the fall of 1971. With its property actually adjoining the border with Chesterfield County in the Bon Air area, some of the students assigned to Huguenot High School had very long school bus rides from the East End of the city. Other students who lived close to Huguenot were assigned as far away as the former John F. Kennedy High School, located past the opposite side of Richmond's city limits in the edge of Henrico County. The river's location running lengthwise through the center of the city and the limited number of bridges in 1971 added to the transportation riding times and mileage. Within a year, white flight became evident in residential housing patterns, especially in the annexed area, where the busing program was cited as a major objection by those leaving the city. Some minority families also objected to the transportation hardships, as well as loss of traditional family participation at neighborhood schools, notably including Richmond high schools named for Maggie L. Walker, Samuel C. Armstrong, and John Marshall which had been attended by generations of some families.

In 1979, Huguenot High School became the Huguenot building within the Jefferson-Huguenot-Wythe High School. Jefferson-Huguenot-Wythe was created by Richmond Public Schools because of declining enrollment and the continued loss of revenue for education. It resulted in combining Thomas Jefferson, Huguenot, and George Wythe into one unique school in three widely separated facilities. This change was implemented to reduce expenses and to create a learning environment which would meet the needs of all students. The plan was difficult to administer and suffered from transportation logistics.

In August, 1986, the Huguenot building was returned to the status of Huguenot High School and has operated as a separate school again since then. Richmond Public Schools added magnet school programs and other projects, and was released by the court-ordered busing program in the early 1990s.

Grammy Award-winning R&B singer D'Angelo attended Huguenot in the early 1990s, but dropped out in 1991 to pursue a music career.

A new Huguenot High School, built beside the original building, opened in January 2015.  The new building broke ground in 2012, and construction wrapped up in December 2014.  The project itself cost an estimated $63 million.

Academics 
The graduation rate for Huguenot High School is 67%, which is well below the state median. The AP participation rate is at 17%.

References

Books
Claflin, Mary Anne, and Richardson, Elizabeth Guy (1977) Bon Air: A History, Hale Publishing, Richmond, Virginia

External links
Official website
 Reunion Website

High schools in Richmond, Virginia
Public high schools in Virginia
1960 establishments in Virginia